Omar Palma is a midfielder. He was born on April 12, 1958, in the city of Campo Largo in the Chaco Province of Argentina. He played most of his career for Rosario Central in Argentina. He was the top scorer of the 1986–87 season with 20 goals in 38 games for Central's championship winning campaign.

Playing career

Club
Palma made his debut with Rosario Central in 1979, he went on to win two titles with the club, the Nacional in 1980 and the 1986-1987 championship.

After his goalscoring feats of the '86–87 season he was signed by Argentine giants River Plate, but his two seasons with the club were far from successful but he did play in both legs of the Copa Interamericana 1987, which River won 3-0.

Palma was sold to Mexican club CD Veracruz in 1989 but he soon returned to Rosario Central. Central won the Copa Conmebol (currently known as Copa Sudamericana) in 1995 and Palma finally retired in 1998 at the age of 40 after making 339 league appearances and scoring 61 goals for the club. He played 355 games for them in all competitions scoring 63 goals.

Honours

Club
 Rosario Central
 Primera Division Argentina: 1980, 1986/87
 Segunda Division Argentina: 1985
 Copa Conmebol: 1995

 River Plate
Copa Interamericana: 1987

Individual
 Primera División Argentina topscorer: 1986/87

External links
Player Statistics at Futbol Pasion 
Player profile at Canalla.com 

1958 births
Living people
Sportspeople from Chaco Province
Argentine footballers
Association football forwards
Rosario Central footballers
Club Atlético Colón footballers
Club Atlético River Plate footballers
C.D. Veracruz footballers
Argentine Primera División players
Primera Nacional players
Liga MX players
Argentine expatriate footballers
Expatriate footballers in Mexico
Rosario Central managers
Argentine football managers